Sodium nitrite/sodium thiosulfate, sold under the brand name Nithiodote, is a fixed-dose combination medication used as an antidote for cyanide poisoning. It contains sodium thiosulfate and sodium nitrite. It is given by intravenous infusion into a vein.

It was approved for medical use in the United States in January 2011.

Medical uses 
Sodium nitrite/sodium thiosulfate is indicated for the treatment of acute cyanide poisoning.

See also 
 Sodium nitrite
 Sodium thiosulfate

References

External links 
 

Combination drugs